Fearless is a 2016 Netflix original documentary series created by Andrew Fried and starring Grant Crookes and Ty Murray following a group of U.S. and Brazilian bull riders on the Professional Bull Riders (PBR) circuit, including 3-time world champion Silvano Alves.

Premise
Fearless follows a group of U.S. and Brazilian professional bull riders. The series takes a look at the community, the background and the current culture of bull riding, with former bull riding world champion Adriano Moraes adding his thoughts periodically.

Cast
 Grant Crookes
 Ty Murray
 Silvano Alves
 Adriano Moraes
 João Ricardo Vieira
 Guilherme Marchi
 Kaique Pacheco
 Cody Nance
 J.B. Mauney
 Renato Nunes
 Robson Palermo
 Valdiron de Oliveira
 Brett Hoffman

Release
It was released on August 19, 2016 on Netflix streaming.

References

External links
 
 
 

Portuguese-language Netflix original programming
Bull riders
Professional Bull Riders